Ulrich Matschoss (16 May 1917 – 1 July 2013) was a German actor.

Personal life 
Matschoss died on 1 July 2013 at the age of 96 at his home in Lüneburger Heide, Germany.

Selected filmography
1959: Raskolnikov (TV film) ... Watch Master
1960: Stahlnetz:  (TV series episode) ... Aufnahmeleiter im Tonstudio
1962: The Counterfeit Traitor ... Bespectacled Suspect at Gestapo H.O.
1966: Three Sisters (TV film) ... Andrei Sergeyevich Prozorov
1967: The Death of Ivan Ilyich (TV film) ... Ivan Ilyich
1981–1991: Tatort (TV series, 15 episodes) ... Kriminaloberrat Karl Königsberg
1986:  (TV miniseries) ... Carl Engels
1989–1990: Mit Leib und Seele (TV series, 19 episodes) ... Wilhelm Dannecker
1994–1998: Hallo, Onkel Doc! (TV series, 68 episodes) ... Professor Hermann Lüders
1997: Red Corner ... Gerhardt Hoffman
1999–2000: Die Kommissarin (TV series, 12 episodes) ... Paul Hagemann
2000:  (TV series episode) ... Kriminaloberrat Karl Königsberg

References

External links

1917 births
2013 deaths
People from Herne, North Rhine-Westphalia
German male film actors
German male television actors
20th-century German male actors
21st-century German male actors